Dimitrije Tomović (born 29 April 1996) is a Serbian footballer who plays as a defender for FK Bane Raška. He mainly operates as a centre-back, being capable of playing on multiple positions in defense or as a defensive midfielder.

Club career

Bane
Born in Raška, Tomović made his first senior appearances with local club Bane. During the first half of 2013–14 season, he played 15 matches and scored 1 goal in the Serbian League West. That goal he scored against Loznica on 13 October, when he was declared as the man of the match. In the winter break off-season 2013–14, Tomović joined OFK Beograd. He was with youth team until the end of 2014. Beginning of 2015, Tomović returned in his home club Bane, where he spent next six months.

Spartak Subotica
In summer 2015, Tomović signed with Spartak Subotica, but he was also loaned to Senta at one-year dual registration. He made his SuperLiga debut in the 11th match fixture of the 2015–16 season, against his former club, OFK Beograd. Returning in Spartak in summer 2016, Tomović spent complete pre-season with the first team, but later moved on loan to ČSK Čelarevo, where he stayed until the end of same year. In March 2017, Tomović signed his first four-and-a-half year professional contract with club. In summer 2017, Tomović on a half-season loan deal to Bačka 1901. In February 2018, Tomović moved on loan to Proleter Novi Sad for the rest of the 2017–18 Serbian First League campaign.

Career statistics

Honours
Proleter Novi Sad
Serbian First League: 2017–18

References

External links
 Dimitrije Tomović stats at utakmica.rs 
 
 

1996 births
Living people
People from Raška, Serbia
Association football defenders
Serbian footballers
FK Bane players
OFK Beograd players
FK Spartak Subotica players
FK Senta players
FK ČSK Čelarevo players
FK Bačka 1901 players
FK Proleter Novi Sad players
FK Hajduk Kula players
OFK Bačka players
FK Železničar Pančevo players
Serbian First League players
Serbian SuperLiga players